David Michael Stith is a singer/songwriter and multi-instrumentalist who released his first album Heavy Ghost in 2009 on the Asthmatic Kitty label. He currently resides in Brooklyn, New York.

David Stith comes from a musical family: his father was a college wind ensemble director and former church choir director; his grandfather is professor emeritus in the music department at Cornell University; his mother is a pianist; and his sisters sing opera and play piano and percussion.

Stith began working on an MFA in graphic design at Indiana University's Henry Radford Hope School of Fine Art in 2008, although he did not complete it. Stith produced the artwork for his Heavy Ghost CD and other projects for Asthmatic Kitty, including cover art for Dead Zone Boys by Jookabox, A Thousand Shark's Teeth and All Things Will Unwind by My Brightest Diamond, Animal Feelings by Rafter, Penelope and Unremembered by Sarah Kirkland Snider, as well as the Library Catalog Music Series.

Music

Heavy Ghost is characterized by densely-layered music, featuring strings and horns on top of Stith's guitar and piano tracks. His multi-tracked voice often provides a quasi-choral backing. Released in 2009, it was very favorably reviewed by many critics, garnering a score of 84 at Metacritic.

Stith has also opened for Sufjan Stevens, and played piano and sang onstage with him during Stevens' 2010 fall tour. On November 19, 2010, he appeared on NBC's Late Night with Jimmy Fallon, supporting Stevens as he performed "Too Much" (from Stevens' 2010 album The Age of Adz).

Stith collaborated with fellow American John-Mark Lapham, formerly of UK/US quartet The Earlies. Under the band name The Revival Hour, "Hold Back", the duo's debut single, was released in November 2010; their EP, Clusterchord, was released in November 2012. Their debut album, Scorpio Little Devil, was released in 2013.

In late 2014, Stith announced a European tour, his first set of live performances as DM Stith in three years, adding that it will be "a sneak preview of his new release due out later in 2015".

His second studio album, Pigeonheart, was released on July 29, 2016, with positive reviews, including a score of 70 on Metacritic.

References

1980 births
Living people
Musicians from Buffalo, New York
Singer-songwriters from New York (state)
Singer-songwriters from Indiana
American male singer-songwriters
Asthmatic Kitty artists
21st-century American singers
21st-century American male singers